Vatuka was King of Anuradhapura in the 1st century BC, who ruled in the year 47 BC. He succeeded Siva I as King of Anuradhapura and was succeeded by Darubhatika Tissa.

See also
 List of Sri Lankan monarchs
 History of Sri Lanka

References

External links
 Kings & Rulers of Sri Lanka
 Codrington's Short History of Ceylon

Monarchs of Anuradhapura
V
V
V